Radio Kiss Kiss is an Italian commercial radio station and one of the first radio station aired from Naples, Italy.
Based in Naples, Italy, with two offices in Rome and Milan, this radio station is devoted to Soul, Funky and Disco music.

External links 
 Radio Kiss Kiss Official site 

Mass media in Naples
Radio stations established in 1976
Radio stations in Italy
1976 establishments in Italy